Heart's Delight is a settlement located to the south of Sittingbourne in Kent, England. Heart's Delight Road, leading to it, has the postal address of Tunstall. At the 2011 Census the population of the settlement was included in the civil parish of Borden.

According to Edward Hasted, in 1798, Heart's Delight was a small hamlet in the parish of Borden. Wrens farm was an estate in 1664 (but called 'Rains Farm') and was owned by a squire from Tunstall.

There are four Grade II listed houses in the village; 'Hearts Delight House', 'Filmer House', 'Sharp's House', and 'Wren's Farmhouse'.

There is a similarly-known settlement near Barham in the City of Canterbury district of Kent

References

Villages in Kent